Naggar Castle is a medieval castle, located in Kullu, Himachal Pradesh, India. Built by Raja Sidh Singh of Kullu in around 1460 A.D, it was taken over to Himachal Pradesh Tourism Development Corporation (HPTDC), to run as a heritage hotel, since 1978.

History
It was the official seat of kings for centuries. According to a legend, Raja Sidh Singh used stones from the abandoned palace (Gardhak) of Rana Bhonsal to build the castle. He ordered the labourers to form a human chain over the Beas river connecting its left and right banks to transfer the stones manually. The castle survived the earthquake of 1905. While most houses in the valley and the nearby city of Jawa were completely ruined, the castle's use of earthquake-proof techniques helped it sustain despite the calamity.

Gallery

See also
Naggar, an ancient town in Kullu district of Himachal Pradesh

References

Kullu
Fortifications in India